Koh Buck Song (born 1963) is a Singaporean writer and poet. He is the author and editor of more than 30 books, including six books of poetry and haiga art. He works as a writer, editor and consultant in branding, communications strategy and corporate social responsibility in Singapore. He has held several exhibitions  as a Singaporean pioneer of haiga art, developed from a 16th-century Japanese art form combining ink sketches with haiku poems.

Literary, artistic & brand advisory career
Koh Buck Song's books as author and editor include six books of poetry and haiga, literary anthologies, books on aspects of Singapore ranging from urban development to foreign investment promotion, the first book on Singapore's country brand, Brand Singapore (2011, translated into Chinese and published in China in 2012, with a third edition in 2021), and a travelogue with a place branding theme, Around The World In 68 Days: Observations Of Life From A Journey Across 13 Countries (2021).  
He was with The Straits Times from 1988 to 1999, where he was literary editor, political supervisor and chief Parliament commentator, arts and features supervisor, and assistant editor of Sunday Review, a weekly world affairs section. His regular personal opinion column, Monday With Koh Buck Song, ran for almost a decade. From 2003 to 2004, he was a contributing columnist on current affairs based in the USA for the Singapore newspaper Today. From 2004 to 2005, he was a regular columnist on leadership for The Straits Times.

He was the English section Editor, and then General Editor, of the multilingual literary and arts journal Singa in the 1990s. In 1992, he was poet-in-residence at the Scottish Poetry Library in Edinburgh under the Singapore-Scotland Cultural Exchange programme. He has represented Singapore at literary conferences including at Cambridge University (UK) and Manila, and in poetry readings at Harvard University and Massachusetts Institute of Technology in the USA. As a haiga artist with several exhibitions in Singapore and Laos, his art builds on earlier work exploring the synergy between poetry and painting, especially in collaborations with the abstract artist Thomas Yeo and the watercolourist Ong Kim Seng. He is the National Gallery Singapore's poet-in-residence 2021-22, the Gallery's third after Edwin Thumboo and Madeleine Lee.
 
As a country brand adviser, he has spoken extensively on brand Singapore overseas, including as keynote speaker at a City Nation Place global conference in London, UK; at the Royal Institute for Governance and Strategic Studies in Phuentsholing, Bhutan; at a Pacific Economic Cooperation Council seminar in Tahiti; at the Japan Foundation in Tokyo as a cultural leader of Singapore; and the Blavatnik School of Government at Oxford University, UK.

His public service has included being Deputy Chairman of the Censorship Review Committee 2009–10, and also a member of the Censorship Review Committees of 1991–92 and 2002–03, the only person to have served on all three panels.

Selected works
 Koh, Buck Song (1992). A Brief History Of Toa Payoh And Other Poems.  .
 Koh, Buck Song (text and poetry editor, with introduction, 1993). Singapore: Places, Poems, Paintings.  .
 Koh, Buck Song (1994), Thumboo, Edwin Nadason (1933– ), in Hamilton, Ian, ed., The Oxford Companion to Twentieth-century Poetry in English, Oxford University Press. .
 Koh, Buck Song (editor, with Ban, Kah Choon et al., 1995). Voices 4 – Readings By Singapore Writers. National University of Singapore. .
 Koh, Buck Song (2000). Toa Payoh: Our Kind Of Neighbourhood.  Housing and Development Board, Singapore. .
 Koh, Buck Song (2001). The Worth Of Wonder.  .
 Koh, Buck Song (editor, 2002). Heart Work: Stories Of How EDB Steered The Singapore Economy From 1961 Into The 21st Century.  .
 Koh, Buck Song (editor, with Bhatia, Umej, 2002). From Boys To Men: A Literary Anthology Of National Service In Singapore.  .
 Koh, Buck Song (2003). The Ocean Of Ambition.  .
 Koh, Buck Song (2005). How Not To Make Money: Inside Stories From Singapore's Commercial Affairs Department.  .
 Koh, Buck Song (2008). Heartlands: Home And Nation In The Art Of Ong Kim Seng. .
 Koh, Buck Song (editor, 2011). Heart Work 2: EDB And Partners: New Frontiers For The Singapore Economy. .
 Koh, Buck Song (2011). Living With The End In Mind: A Study Of How To Increase The Quality Of Death In Singapore – Perspectives Of 30 Leaders, Lien Foundation.
 Koh, Buck Song (2011). Brand Singapore: How Nation Branding Built Asia's Leading Global City. .
 Koh, Buck Song (2012). Perpetual Spring: Singapore's Gardens By The Bay.  (hardcover).  (paperback).
 Koh, Buck Song (2014). Learning For Life: Singapore’s Investment In Lifelong Learning Since The 1950s. .
 Koh, Buck Song (2016). Our Guardians: Keeping Singapore Safe And Secure Since The 1950s. .
 Koh, Buck Song (second edition, 2017). Brand Singapore: Nation Branding After Lee Kuan Yew, In A Divisive World. .
 Koh, Buck Song (editor, 2018). Making Cities Liveable: Insights From 10 Years Of Lectures At The Centre for Liveable Cities. .
 Koh, Buck Song (third edition, 2021). Brand Singapore: Nation Branding In A World Disrupted by Covid-19. 
 Koh, Buck Song (2021). Around The World In 68 Days: Observations Of Life From A Journey Across 13 Countries. 
 Koh, Buck Song (editor, 2022). "One United People": Essays From The People Sector On Singapore's Journey Of Racial Harmony.

Selected works in anthologies & other books
 Sionil Jose, Francisco (1991). New Voices In Southeast Asia. Solidarity, Manila, Philippines.
 Singh, Kirpal (editor, et al. 2000). Rhythms: A Singaporean Millennial Anthology Of Poetry. National Arts Council, Singapore. .
 ASEAN Committee on Culture and Information (2000). Modern Literature of ASEAN.
 Edwin Thumboo & Yeow, Kai Chai (editors, 2009). Reflecting On The Merlion: An Anthology Of Poems. National Arts Council, Singapore. .
 Poon, Angelia; Holden, Philip & Lim, Shirley Geok-lin (editors, 2009). Writing Singapore: An Historical Anthology Of Singapore Literature. National University of Singapore Press, Singapore.  .   .
 Gwee Li Sui, (editor, 2016). Written Country: The History of Singapore through Literature. .
 Essay: "Tommy Koh on the Censorship Review Committee 1991-92", in Yeo, Lay Hwee et al (editors, 2018). Tommy Koh: Serving Singapore And The World. 
 Essay: "The English language in Singapore: Lens and Launchpad to the World", in Tommy Koh & Wightman, Scott (editors, 2019). 200 Years Of Singapore And The United Kingdom. 
 Essay: "America - The Top 'Soft Superpower'", in Tommy Koh & Singh, Daljit (editors, 2021). America: A Singapore Perspective.

Selected haiga art exhibitions & talks
 "Six Views Of Japan And Singapore". Super Japan Festival of Japanese Arts. The Esplanade – Theatres on the Bay. May 2016.
 "Refleksi: A Pantun Art Exhibition (using the Malay poetic form pantun). National Poetry Festival. LASALLE College of the Arts. August 2016.
 "Between Japan And Singapore: Haiga And Its Modern Legacy". Singapore Writers Festival. The Arts House at the Old Parliament. November 2016.
 "ASEAN@50 Haiga: Vientiane 2017". ASEAN Insurance Council. Vientiane, Laos. November 2017.

References

Further reading

 National Library, Singapore. Chua, Alvin: Singapore Infopedia: 
 National Arts Council, Singapore – Literary Singapore: A Directory of Contemporary Writing in Singapore, 2011.
 National Book Development Council of Singapore. Database of Singapore Writers: 
 Lee Kuan Yew School of Public Policy, National University of Singapore. 2006 media coverage by faculty: "Anyone can be a leader, not just the man at the top": 
 Singapore Management University. Knowledge@SMU: "Singapore’s brand “keloid”: Going beyond canes and chewing gums", July 2011: 
 Institute of Policy Studies. Roundtable: "Brand Singapore", May 2011: 
 Public Service Division, Singapore. Challenge magazine, July–August 2011: 
 Portfolio magazine. Almagro, Marc. 13 June 2017: 
 Place Brand Observer. 8 December 2020: 
 Spotify conversation with Colombian podcaster Paola Segura Salguero. 27 July 2021. 

1963 births
Living people
Harvard Kennedy School alumni
Singaporean journalists
Singaporean people of Chinese descent
Singaporean poets
Alumni of the University of London
Communications consultants
Alumni of the University of Cambridge
Hwa Chong Junior College alumni
Saint Andrew's School, Singapore alumni
Branding consultants
Singaporean consultants